The Guam women's national under-20 football team is the age of at U-20 female team which representative football team for Guam. The plays AFC U-20 Women's Asian Cup. The team has noy yet qualified FIFA U-20 Women's World Cup.

History
The Guam women's national under-20 football team have played their debut match versus Japan on 19 April 2002 at Goa, India which they lost by 0–15 goals. They team has played first two edition of AFC U-20 Women's Asian Cup but result of the edition did not qualify.

Current squad
The following squad were named for 2019 AFC U-19 Women's Championship qualification

Fixtures and results
legend

2019

2023

Competitive record

FIFA U-20 Women's World Cup

*Draws include knock-out matches decided on penalty kicks.

AFC U-20 Women's Asian Cup

AFC U-20 Women's Asian Cup qualification

References 

Football in Guam
Asian women's national under-20 association football teams